Big Nazo is a performance group headquartered in Providence, Rhode Island .  Erminio Pinque, who is both the founder and artistic designer of Big Nazo, envisioned his concept as a puppet show without the stage.

Big Nazo, which derives its name from "big nose" in Italian, made an appearance at the 2010 Winter Olympics.

Big Nazo runs a "creature class" in conjunction with the Rhode Island School of Design Film and Video Department during the winter semester.

References

External links
 Big Nazo's website

Performance artist collectives
Organizations based in Providence, Rhode Island